Mark Peter Hickson (born 19 July 1964) is an English former cricketer.

Hickson was born at Farnborough. He was educated at Tonbridge School, before going up to Durham University. While studying at Durham, Hickson was selected in the British Universities squad for the 1988 Benson & Hedges Cup, making two List A one-day appearances in the competition against Somerset at Oxford, and Glamorgan at Cardiff. He scored 14 runs in his two matches, as well as taking a single wicket.

References

External links

1964 births
Living people
People from Farnborough, London
People educated at Tonbridge School
Alumni of Durham University
English cricketers
British Universities cricketers